The 1962–63 SM-sarja season was the 32nd season of the SM-sarja, the top level of ice hockey in Finland. 10 teams participated in the league, and Lukko Rauma won the championship.

Regular season

External links
 Season on hockeyarchives.info

Fin
Liiga seasons
1962–63 in Finnish ice hockey